The following lists in detail the discography of Poco.

Albums

Studio albums

Live albums

Compilation albums

Singles

References

External links
 

Country music discographies
Discographies of American artists
Rock music group discographies